Ulphée-Wilbrod Rousseau (January 26, 1882 – September 11, 1967) was a politician Quebec, Canada and a two-term Member of the Legislative Assembly of Quebec (MLA).

Early life

He was born on January 26, 1882, in Sainte-Geneviève-de-Batiscan, Mauricie. He made career in the construction business.

Member of the legislature

Rousseau ran as an Action libérale nationale candidate in the district of Champlain in the 1935 provincial election and won. He became a member of the Union Nationale and was re-elected as such in 1936.

He did not run for re-election in 1939.

Death

He died on September 11, 1967, in Joliette.

See also
Champlain Provincial Electoral District
Mauricie

References

1882 births
1967 deaths
Action libérale nationale MNAs
Union Nationale (Quebec) MNAs